The Moçamedes snake-eyed skink (Panaspis mocamedensis) is a species of lidless skinks in the family Scincidae. The species is found in Angola.

References

Panaspis
Reptiles described in 2020
Endemic fauna of Angola
Reptiles of Angola
Taxa named by Luis M. P. Ceríaco
Taxa named by Matthew P. Heinicke
Taxa named by Kelly L. Parker
Taxa named by Mariana P. Marques
Taxa named by Aaron M. Bauer